The following are the national records in track cycling in Great Britain maintained by Great Britain's national cycling federation: British Cycling.

Men
Key to tables:

Women

Notes

References
General
British Track Cycling Records October 2022 updated
Specific

External links
British Cycling web site

Great Britain
records
Track cycling
track cycling